The CHL Player of the Year award is given out annually to the player judged to be the most outstanding in the Canadian Hockey League. It is selected from three most valuable players of the respective leagues; the Red Tilson Trophy of Ontario Hockey League, the Michel Brière Memorial Trophy of the Quebec Major Junior Hockey League, and the Four Broncos Memorial Trophy of the Western Hockey League.

As of the 2021–22 selection, Sidney Crosby (2003–04, 2004–05) and Alexis Lafrenière (2018–19, 2019–20) are the only repeat winners.

Winners
List of winners of the CHL Player of the Year award.

See also
 List of Canadian Hockey League awards

References

External links
 CHL Awards – CHL

Canadian Hockey League trophies and awards
Ice hockey player of the year awards